YSR Sampoorna Poshana is a welfare program launched by the Government of Andhra Pradesh to provide nutritious food to children, pregnant women and lactating mothers.

Development 
YSR Sampoorna Poshana was launched by Chief minister of Andhra Pradesh Y. S. Jagan Mohan Reddy on 7th September, 2020 with a budget of ₹1,863 crore per annum covering around 30.16 lakh women and children of the state. YSR Sampoorna Poshana Plus has been launched to exclusively provide nutritious food to the women and children of 77 tribal mandals.

The scheme 
The scheme was launched to eradicate malnutrition among kids by providing nutritious food to pregnant women, children and lactating mothers. YSR Sampoorna Poshana Mobile App was launched for the transparency and the ease of availing scheme to the beneficiaries.

References 

Child welfare in India
Government welfare schemes in Andhra Pradesh